Hedenstroemiidae is an extinct family of cephalopods in the ammonoid order Ceratitida. They were nektonic carnivores.

Genera
 Clypites Waagen 1895
 Cordillerites Hyatt and Smith 1905
 Hedenstroemia Waagen 1895
 Mesohedenstroemia Chao 1959
 Parahedenstroemia Spath 1934
 Pseudohedenstroemia
 Pseudosageceras Diener 1895
 Tellerites Mojsisovics 1902

Distribution
Fossils of species within this family have been found in the Triassic of Afghanistan, Canada, Oman, Pakistan, Russia and United States.

References

 
Triassic ammonites
Ceratitida families